Shadows in a Conflict is a 1993 Spanish drama film directed by Mario Camus. It was entered into the 18th Moscow International Film Festival. The film portrays the dirty war against ETA waged by elements of the Spanish State.

Cast
 Carmen Maura as Ana
 Joaquim de Almeida as José (as Joaquim De Almeida)
 Tito Valverde as Darío
 Sonia Martín as Blanca
 Ramón Langa as Fernando
 Paco Hernández as Hombre I (as Francisco Hernández)
 Felipe Vélez as Hombre II
 Miguel Zúñiga as Funcionario
 Isabel de Castro as Madre José (as Isabel De Castro)
 Elisa Lisboa as Amalia

References

External links
 

1993 films
1993 drama films
Spanish drama films
1990s Spanish-language films
Films directed by Mario Camus
Films about ETA (separatist group)
1990s Spanish films
Films about the Spanish Transition